The Rooikat (Afrikaans for "Caracal") is a South African armoured reconnaissance vehicle equipped with a stabilised 76 mm high velocity gun for organic anti-tank and fire support purposes. The Rooikat's main armament was built with the Oto Melara 76 naval gun as its basis, to which it is nearly identical in terms of technical performance and statistics. The Rooikat can also fire the same ammunition as the naval gun, albeit modified with new percussion primers in the shells.

Development history

Background
From the mid 1960s to the mid 1980s, the standard reconnaissance vehicle of the South African Defence Force was the Eland-90, a four-wheeled armoured car modelled closely after the Panhard AML-90. However, the Eland was designed for border patrols and internal security, and proved ill-suited to countering tank warfare. The Eland's limitations were first observed during combat in Operation Savannah, a 1975 South African incursion into Angola. This led to its supplementation in the late 1970s with the much heavier, six-wheeled Ratel-90 infantry fighting vehicle. The Ratel proved to be a successful interim measure because it could both carry troops and provide fire support.

In 1984, South Africa launched Operation Askari, which saw its mechanised and motorised infantry contingents threatened by large Angolan tank formations for the first time. Both the Ratel-90 and Eland-90 were used as improvised tank destroyers but performed inadequately against T-54/55 tanks of the People's Armed Forces for the Liberation of Angola (FAPLA). The armoured cars were decisively outranged by the Angolan tanks, and their inability to fire on the move resulted in a poor rate of engagement. As a direct result of Askari, the Eland was removed from combat service and a squadron of Olifant tanks kept on permanent standby to assist with neutralising enemy armour during future South African operations.

As early as the mid 1970s, the South African Armoured Corps had issued a requirement for a "heavy armoured car" capable of improving upon the Eland's 4X4 chassis, which limited mobility, and the mediocre range of its 90mm low pressure gun. Research was undertaken for a New Generation Armoured Car project between 1976 and 1979, when three 8X8 prototypes were built by Sandock-Austral and trialled in Potchefstroom. The prototypes were built using the components of the Ratel, Eland and Alvis Saracen, and were armed with a 77mm HV tank gun. The Saracen and Ratel derivatives could each accommodate four crewmen – gunner, commander, loader and driver – while the Eland derivative accommodated five, including one passenger. These trials were primarily for the purpose of evaluating the vehicles' performance on different types of local terrain; while none of the three were deemed acceptable for the New Generation Armoured Car programme, the chassis built with Eland components continued to influence later prototypes—particularly with regards to its suspension features.

Three more contenders appeared in 1982: the Bismarck, the Cheetah Mk1, and the Cheetah Mk2. These prototypes were designed with technical assistance from a West German engineering firm, Thyssen-Henschel. The Bismarck was an eight-wheeled vehicle which weighed over forty metric tonnes and carried a 105mm Denel GT-7 tank gun. The Cheetah Mk1 was six-wheeled and carried a lightweight 76mm gun or a 60mm breech-loading mortar (adopted from the Eland-60); it resembled a modified TH-400. Also known as "Model 2B", the Cheetah Mk2 was eight-wheeled and possessed an inferior range to the Cheetah Mk1, but was considerably faster. These prototypes were trialled in March 1984 and the Cheetah Mk2 was accepted by the South African Army. The Armoured Corps had hoped to simplify logistics by replacing both the Eland and Ratel simultaneously with a new chassis that could double as both a reconnaissance vehicle and an infantry fighting vehicle, similar to the Ratel-90 interim measure, but these plans were shelved. A fourth, multirole eight-wheeled prototype evaluated in 1984 was rejected and a decision was made to retain the Ratel for the foreseeable future while pursuing the separate development of the Cheetah Mk2, now denoted as the Rooikat. In its final form the Rooikat incorporated several features adopted directly from the Eland-90, namely the same auxiliary turret sights and the mounting of all eight wheels on trailing arms, with the same hydropneumatic shock absorbers and coil springs.

The first Rooikats were manufactured by Sandock-Austral beginning in September 1987, and delivered to the South African Army for further tests by December. Another three were delivered in October 1988. The Rooikat did not enter service in large numbers until August 1989, when a single South African armoured squadron began receiving it. Mass production commenced around mid 1990.

Service
Upon its inception in 1994 the South African National Defence Force (SANDF) immediately retired the surviving Eland-90 fleet. Nevertheless, some Elands remained with reserve units as late as 1996 since there were only 176 Rooikats in service at the time. The SANDF subsequently issued a requirement for another 66 Rooikats from Sandock-Austral, which had been absorbed by Land Systems OMC. New SANDF doctrine placed an emphasis on the Rooikat's primary role of reconnaissance, as well as the harassment of enemy rearguard units. In a marked departure from the manoeuvre-oriented anti-tank tactics of the South African Border War, Rooikat crews were also trained to engage tanks only from defilade or otherwise static defensive positions.

Just prior to general elections in 1994, the South African Army deployed the Rooikat for internal patrols. During the Southern African Development Community intervention in Lesotho, Rooikats of the 1 Special Service Battalion were called up to reinforce South African mechanised units then skirmishing with Lesotho Army mutineers. The armoured cars arrived in Maseru, the capital of Lesotho, on 22 September 1998 and participated in various security operations.

Proposed variants

Rooikat 105
In 1990 an upgrade and redesign programme was started by Reumech OMC to customise the Rooikat for the international market, and by 1994 the development of a Rooikat 105 prototype with a 105mm rifled gun was completed.

The Rooikat 105 is designed for high mobility day and night combat operations. Passive image intensifiers and thermal imaging equipment for night driving, navigation and weapon deployment permit round-the-clock combat operations. The Rooikat 105 is equipped with a GT7 105mm anti-tank gun. The gun fires the full range of NATO full-pressure 105mm ammunition including generation I, II and III rounds. The gun, fitted with a 51-caliber thermal sleeve encased barrel, fires six rounds a minute. There are two 7.62mm machine guns, one co-axial to the main armament and one at the commander's position, for general purpose ground and air defence. The vehicle is equipped with two banks of 81mm smoke grenade launchers, mounted in a forward firing position on each side of the turret. The system is electrically operated. The smoke grenades form a dense protective smoke screen, which can be sustained using an exhaust smoke generator. The digital fire control system takes data from a suite of sensors and provides an automatic fire control solution. Automatic data input includes target range from a laser rangefinder, target speed and direction derived from tracking the target, crosswind speed, weapon tilt and the characteristics of the weapon. Manual data input includes ammunition type and environmental data. The fire control system allows the Rooikat to engage enemy targets while on the move across rough terrain. The time between laser ranging the target and firing is approximately two seconds. Three variations of fire directing systems are offered. The most complex system incorporates a primary stabilised gunner's sight, automatic computation and implementation of ballistic offset of the weapon, electro-mechanical gun control, stabilised main weapon, gunner's sight with day / night channel slaved to the main weapon and an independent panoramic commander's sight.

Rooikat ZA35 Self Propelled Anti-aircraft Gun
This Rooikat version was developed by ARMSCOR in the early 90s. The ZA-35 SPAAG is armed with two Lyttelton Engineering M-35 guns. These guns have a combined rate of fire at 1,100 rounds per minute and fire HE-FRAG rounds against air targets and AP-I against light armoured vehicles. The ZA-35 is fitted with an EDR 110 surveillance and tracking radar, which can track up to 100 air targets simultaneously. The antenna can be raised to a height of about 5 metres for increased visibility, when the vehicle is stationary. It can provide targeting data to other nearby SPAAGs and air defence systems, which do not have radars. It is also fitted with a computerised fire control system, fully stabilised gunner's sight and a laser rangefinder.

Rooikat SAM
The Rooikat SAM was intended to be used together with the Rooikat SPAAG, this ZA-HVM short-range SAM, would also have been based on the same chassis.

Rooikat 35/ZT-3
A prototype Rooikat 35 was also developed with a new turret to incorporate ZT-3 antitank missiles.

Technology demonstrators
One Rooikat was turned into a conventional vehicle electric drive technology demonstrator (CVED) and displayed at AAD2006 in Cape Town in September of that year. The CVED project involved LMT, HIT, IAD, Nezrotek, Hotchinson (France), Kessler Magnet Motor (Germany) and MTU (Germany). VEG Magazine reported in 2006 the vehicle was fitted with a power supply control system feeding eight wheel-hub mounted M67/0 electric units and a two-phase pneumatic gearbox.

Capability
 Can climb a 1 m earth vertical step.
 Can cross a 2-metre-wide trench at a crawl and 1 m @ 60 km/h.
 Can ford water 1.5 m deep.
 Can climb a gradient of 70 degrees.
 Can traverse a gradient of 30 degrees.

Variant table

Operators

: 240 units.

See also

Vehicles of comparable role, performance, and era
B1 Centauro
M1128 Mobile Gun System
Type 16 maneuver combat vehicle
Vextra 105

References

External links

 Manufacturer's website (Accessed 28 July 2008)
 Factfile on Vehicle (Accessed 25 February 2009)
 Rooikat 76 Armoured Fighting Vehicle

Armoured cars
Military vehicles introduced in the 1980s
Fire support vehicles
Armoured fighting vehicles of the Cold War
Armoured fighting vehicles of South Africa
Tank destroyers
Reconnaissance vehicles of the Cold War
Denel
Eight-wheeled vehicles